Barbados participated in the 2010 Summer Youth Olympics in Singapore.

The Barbados team consisted of 9 athletes competing in 5 sports: Athletics, Equestrian, Judo, Swimming and Tennis

Athletics

Boys
Track and Road Events

Girls
Track and Road Events

Equestrian

Judo

Individual

Team

Swimming

Tennis

Singles

Doubles

References

External links
Competitors List: Barbados

Nations at the 2010 Summer Youth Olympics
2010 in Barbadian sport
Barbados at the Youth Olympics